This is a complete list of Scottish Statutory Instruments in 2003.

1-100

 Cairngorms National Park Designation, Transitional and Consequential Provisions (Scotland) Order 2003 (S.S.I. 2003/1)
 Cairngorms National Park Elections (Scotland) Order 2003 (S.S.I. 2003/2)
 Plastic Materials and Articles in Contact with Food (Amendment) (Scotland) Regulations 2003 (S.S.I. 2003/9)
 Education (Disability Strategies) (Scotland) Amendment Regulations 2003 (S.S.I. 2003/10)
 National Health Service (General Medical Services) (Scotland) Amendment Regulations 2003 (S.S.I. 2003/11)
 Food Protection (Emergency Prohibitions) (Amnesic Shellfish Poisoning) (West Coast) (No. 6) (Scotland) Order 2002 Revocation Order 2003 (S.S.I. 2003/17)
 Food Protection (Emergency Prohibitions) (Amnesic Shellfish Poisoning) (West Coast) (No. 15) (Scotland) Order 2002 Revocation Order 2003 (S.S.I. 2003/18)
 Intercountry Adoption (Hague Convention) (Scotland) Regulations 2003 (S.S.I. 2003/19)
 Police and Police (Special Constables) (Scotland) Amendment Regulations 2003 (S.S.I. 2003/21)
  Food Protection (Emergency Prohibitions) (Amnesic Shellfish Poisoning) (West Coast) (No. 13) (Scotland) Order 2002 Partial Revocation Order 2003 (S.S.I. 2003/22)
 Food Protection (Emergency Prohibitions) (Amnesic Shellfish Poisoning) (West Coast) (No. 12) (Scotland) Order 2002 Revocation Order 2003 (S.S.I. 2003/23)
 Food Protection (Emergency Prohibitions) (Amnesic Shellfish Poisoning) (West Coast) (No. 14) (Scotland) Order 2002 Revocation Order 2003 (S.S.I. 2003/24)
 Act of Sederunt (Ordinary Cause Rules) Amendment (Form of Simplified Divorce Application) 2003 (S.S.I. 2003/25)
 Act of Sederunt (Ordinary Cause, Summary Application, Summary Cause and Small Claim Rules) Amendment (Miscellaneous) 2003 (S.S.I. 2003/26)
 Act of Sederunt (Summary Applications, Statutory Applications and Appeals etc. Rules) Amendment (International Criminal Court) 2003 (S.S.I. 2003/27)
 Tobacco Advertising and Promotion (Sponsorship Transitional Provisions) (Scotland) Regulations 2003 (S.S.I. 2003/34)
 Local Government Finance (Scotland) Order 2003 (S.S.I. 2003/42)
 Act of Sederunt (Child Care and Maintenance Rules) Amendment (1993 Hague Convention Adoption) 2003 (S.S.I. 2003/44)
 Extended Sentences for Violent Offenders (Scotland) Order 2003 (S.S.I. 2003/48)
 Civil Legal Aid (Scotland) Amendment Regulations 2003 (S.S.I. 2003/49)
 Regulation of Investigatory Powers (Prescription of Offices, Ranks and Positions) (Scotland) Amendment (No. 2) Order 2003 (S.S.I. 2003/50)
 Action Programme for Nitrate Vulnerable Zones (Scotland) Regulations 2003 (S.S.I. 2003/51)
 Nitrate Vulnerable Zones (Grants) (Scotland) Scheme 2003 (S.S.I. 2003/52)
 Animal By-Products (Identification) Amendment (Scotland) Regulations 2003 (S.S.I. 2003/53)
 Housing Revenue Account General Fund Contribution Limits (Scotland) Order 2003 (S.S.I. 2003/54)
 National Health Service Superannuation Scheme (Scotland) Amendment Regulations 2003 (S.S.I. 2003/55)
 Sea Fishing (Restriction on Days at Sea) (Scotland) Order 2003 (S.S.I. 2003/56)
 Community Care and Health (Scotland) Act 2002 (Commencement No. 2) Order 2003 (S.S.I. 2003/62)
 Community Care and Health (Scotland) Act 2002 (Transitional Provisions) Order 2003 (S.S.I. 2003/63)
 National Health Service (General Medical Services Supplementary Lists) (Scotland) Regulations 2003 (S.S.I. 2003/64)
 Domestic Water and Sewerage Charges (Reduction) (Scotland) Regulations 2003 (S.S.I. 2003/65)
 Sea Fishing (Restriction on Days at Sea) (Scotland) Amendment Order 2003 (S.S.I. 2003/66)
 Registration of Foreign Adoptions (Scotland) Regulations 2003 (S.S.I. 2003/67)
 National Assistance (Assessment of Resources) Amendment (Scotland) Regulations 2003 (S.S.I. 2003/69)
 Road Traffic (Permitted Parking Area and Special Parking Area) (Aberdeen City Council) Designation Order 2003 (S.S.I. 2003/70)
 Road Traffic (Parking Adjudicators) (Aberdeen City Council) Regulations 2003 (S.S.I. 2003/71)
 Parking Attendants (Wearing of Uniforms) (Aberdeen City Council Parking Area) Regulations 2003 (S.S.I. 2003/72)
 Taxi Drivers' Licences (Carrying of Guide Dogs and Hearing Dogs) (Scotland) Regulations 2003 (S.S.I. 2003/73)
 Ethical Standards in Public Life etc. (Scotland) Act 2000 (Commencement No. 3) Order 2003 (S.S.I. 2003/74)
 The Schools (Scotland) Code Amendment Regulations 2003 (S.S.I. 2003/75)
 Representation of the People (Variation of Limits of Candidates' Local Government Election Expenses) (Scotland) Order 2003 76)
 Sea Fish (Prohibited Methods of Fishing) (Firth of Clyde) Order 2003 (S.S.I. 2003/79)
 The Tobacco Advertising and Promotion Act 2002 (Commencement No. 4) (Scotland) (Amendment and Transitional Provisions) Order 2003 (S.S.I. 2003/80)
 Food Protection (Emergency Prohibitions) (Amnesic Shellfish Poisoning) (West Coast) (No. 11) (Scotland) Order 2002 Revocation Order 2003 (S.S.I. 2003/81)
 Standards in Scotland's Schools etc. Act 2000 (Commencement No. 6) Order 2003 (S.S.I. 2003/84)
 Surface Waters (Fishlife) (Classification) (Scotland) Amendment Regulations 2003 (S.S.I. 2003/85)
 National Assistance (Sums for Personal Requirements) (Scotland) Regulations 2003 (S.S.I. 2003/86)
 Fishing Vessels (Decommissioning) (Scotland) Scheme 2003 (S.S.I. 2003/87)
 Sea Fishing (Enforcement of Community Quota and Third Country Fishing Measures) (Scotland) Order 2003 (S.S.I. 2003/88)
 Births, Deaths, Marriages and Divorces (Fees) (Scotland) Amendment Regulations 2003 (S.S.I. 2003/89)
 Food Protection (Emergency Prohibitions) (Amnesic Shellfish Poisoning) (West Coast) (No. 13) (Scotland) Order 2002 Partial Revocation (No. 2) Order 2003 (S.S.I. 2003/90)
 Bluetongue (Scotland) Order 2003 (S.S.I. 2003/91)
 Proceeds of Crime Act 2002 (Disclosure of Information to and by Lord Advocate and Scottish Ministers) Order 2003 (S.S.I. 2003/93)
 Proceeds of Crime Act 2002 (Investigations: Code of Practice) (Scotland) Order 2003 (S.S.I. 2003/94)
 Child Support Appeals (Jurisdiction of Courts) (Scotland) Order 2003 (S.S.I. 2003/96)
 Sheriff Court Fees Amendment Order 2003 (S.S.I. 2003/97)
 Act of Sederunt (Summary Applications, Statutory Applications and Appeals etc. Rules) Amendment (No. 6) (Proceeds of Crime Act 2002) 2003 (S.S.I. 2003/98)
 Sea Fish (Prohibited Methods of Fishing) (Firth of Clyde) Amendment Order 2003 (S.S.I. 2003/100)

101-200

 Feeding Stuffs (Scotland) Amendment Regulations 2003 (S.S.I. 2003/101)
 Tobacco Advertising and Promotion Act 2002 (Commencement No. 5) (Scotland) Order 2003 (S.S.I. 2003/113)
 Food Protection (Emergency Prohibitions) (Amnesic Shellfish Poisoning) (West Coast) (No. 13) (Scotland) Order 2002 Revocation Order 2003 (S.S.I. 2003/115)
 Sea Fishing (Transitional Support) (Scotland) (No. 2) Scheme 2003 (S.S.I. 2003/116)
 Pesticides (Maximum Residue Levels in Crops, Food and Feeding Stuffs) (Scotland) Amendment Regulations 2003 (S.S.I. 2003/118)
 Ethical Standards in Public Life etc. (Scotland) Act 2000 (Devolved Public Bodies) Order 2003 (S.S.I. 2003/119)
 Act of Adjournal (Criminal Procedure Rules Amendment) (Proceeds of Crime Act 2002) 2003 (S.S.I. 2003/120)
 Adoption (Intercountry Aspects) Act 1999 (Commencement No. 10) (Scotland) Order 2003 (S.S.I. 2003/121)
 Ethical Standards in Public Life etc. (Scotland) Act 2000 (Stipulated Time Limit) Order 2003 (S.S.I. 2003/122)
 Non-Domestic Rate (Scotland) Order 2003 (S.S.I. 2003/123)
 Strathclyde Passenger Transport Authority (Constitution, Membership and Transitional and Consequential Provisions) Amendment Order 2003 (S.S.I. 2003/128)
 Less Favoured Area Support Scheme (Scotland) Regulations 2003 (S.S.I. 2003/129)
 National Health Service (Charges for Drugs and Appliances) (Scotland) Amendment Regulations 2003 (S.S.I. 2003/130)
 National Health Service (General Dental Services) (Scotland) Amendment Regulations 2003 (S.S.I. 2003/131)
 Miscellaneous Food Additives (Amendment) (Scotland) Regulations 2003 (S.S.I. 2003/132)
 Local Government in Scotland Act 2003 (Commencement No.1) Order 2003 (S.S.I. 2003/134)
 Ethical Standards in Public Life etc. (Scotland) Act 2000 (Register of Interests) Regulations 2003 (S.S.I. 2003/135)
 Adults with Incapacity (Scotland) Act 2000 (Commencement No. 3) Order 2003 (S.S.I. 2003/136)
 Council Tax (Liability of Owners) (Scotland) Amendment Regulations 2003 (S.S.I. 2003/137)
 Local Government Pension Scheme (Management and Investment of Funds) (Scotland) Amendment Regulations 2003 (S.S.I. 2003/138)
 Natural Mineral Water, Spring Water and Bottled Drinking Water (Amendment) (Scotland) Regulations 2003 (S.S.I. 2003/139)
 Housing (Scotland) Act 2001 (Payments out of Grants for Housing Support Services) Order 2003 (S.S.I. 2003/140)
 Non-Domestic Rating (Rural Areas and Rateable Value Limits) (Scotland) Amendment Order 2003 (S.S.I. 2003/141)
 Non-Domestic Rating (Former Agricultural Premises) (Scotland) Order 2003 (S.S.I. 2003/142)
 Valuation (Stud Farms) (Scotland) Order 2003 (S.S.I. 2003/143)
 Cinematograph (Safety) (Scotland) Amendment Regulations 2003 (S.S.I. 2003/144)
 Fish Labelling (Scotland) Regulations 2003 (S.S.I. 2003/145)
 Pollution Prevention and Control (Scotland) Amendment Regulations 2003 (S.S.I. 2003/146)
 Council Tax (Supply of Information) (Scotland) Regulations 2003 (S.S.I. 2003/147)
 Regulation of Care (Registration and Registers) (Scotland) Amendment Regulations 2003 (S.S.I. 2003/148)
 Regulation of Care (Requirements as to Care Services) (Scotland) Amendment Regulations 2003 (S.S.I. 2003/149)
 Regulation of Care (Requirements as to Limited Registration Services) (Scotland) Regulations 2003 (S.S.I. 2003/150)
 Regulation of Care (Applications and Provision of Advice) (Scotland) Amendment Order 2003 (S.S.I. 2003/151)
 Regulation of Care (Fees) (Scotland) Order 2003 (S.S.I. 2003/152)
 NHS Health Scotland (Transfer of Officers) Regulations 2003 (S.S.I. 2003/153)
 Health Education Board for Scotland Amendment Order 2003 (S.S.I. 2003/154)
 Adults with Incapacity (Management of Residents' Finances) (Scotland) Regulations 2003 (S.S.I. 2003/155)
 National Assistance (Assessment of Resources) Amendment (No. 2) (Scotland) Regulations 2003 (S.S.I. 2003/156)
 Budget (Scotland) Act 2002 Amendment Order 2003 (S.S.I. 2003/157)
 National Health Service (Dental Charges) (Scotland) Regulations 2003 (S.S.I. 2003/158)
 National Health Service (Functions of the Common Services Agency) (Scotland) Amendment Order 2003 (S.S.I. 2003/159)
 Non-Domestic Rates (Levying) (Scotland) Regulations 2003 (S.S.I. 2003/160)
 Housing Support Grant (Scotland) Order 2003 (S.S.I. 2003/161)
 Act of Sederunt (Fees of Solicitors in the Sheriff Court) (Amendment) 2003 (S.S.I. 2003/162)
 Advice and Assistance (Scotland) Amendment Regulations 2003 (S.S.I. 2003/163)
 Common Agricultural Policy (Wine) (Scotland) Amendment Regulations 2003 (S.S.I. 2003/164)
 Products of Animal Origin (Third Country Imports) (Scotland) Amendment Regulations 2003 (S.S.I. 2003/165)
 Prohibition of Fishing with Multiple Trawls (No. 2) (Scotland) Amendment Order 2003 (S.S.I. 2003/166)
 Sea Fish (Specified Sea Areas) (Regulation of Nets and Other Fishing Gear) (Scotland) Amendment Order 2003 (S.S.I. 2003/167)
 Anti-Pollution Works (Scotland) Regulations 2003 (S.S.I. 2003/168)
 Action Programme for Nitrate Vulnerable Zones (Scotland) Amendment Regulations 2003 (S.S.I. 2003/169)
 Waste Incineration (Scotland) Regulations 2003 (S.S.I. 2003/170)
 Waste Management Licensing Amendment (Scotland) Regulations 2003 (S.S.I. 2003/171)
 Police Grant (Scotland) Order 2003 (S.S.I. 2003/172)
 Financial Assistance for Environmental Purposes (Scotland) Order 2003 (S.S.I. 2003/173)
 Zoo Licensing Act 1981 Amendment (Scotland) Regulations 2003 (S.S.I. 2003/174)
 Planning and Compensation Act 1991 (Amendment of Schedule 18) (Scotland) Order 2003 (S.S.I. 2003/175)
 Council Tax (Discounts) (Scotland) Consolidation and Amendment Order 2003 (S.S.I. 2003/176)
 Rural Stewardship Scheme (Scotland) Amendment Regulations 2003 (S.S.I. 2003/177)
 Civil Legal Aid (Scotland) (Fees) Amendment Regulations 2003 (S.S.I. 2003/178)
 Advice and Assistance (Assistance by Way of Representation) (Scotland) Regulations 2003 (S.S.I. 2003/179)
 Advice and Assistance (Financial Conditions) (Scotland) Regulations 2003 (S.S.I. 2003/180)
 The Regulation of Investigatory Powers (Covert Human Intelligence Sources - Code of Practice) (Scotland) Order 2003 (S.S.I. 2003/181)
 Civil Legal Aid (Financial Conditions) (Scotland) Regulations 2003 (S.S.I. 2003/182)
 Regulation of Investigatory Powers (Covert Surveillance - Code of Practice) (Scotland) Order 2003 (S.S.I. 2003/183)
 Members of the Parole Board (Removal Tribunal) Regulations 2003 (S.S.I. 2003/184)
 Pollution Prevention and Control (Designation of Landfill Directive) (Scotland) Order 2003 (S.S.I. 2003/185)
 Water Undertakings (Rateable Values) (Scotland) Order 2003 (S.S.I. 2003/187)
 The Non-Domestic Rating (Petrol Filling Stations, Public Houses and Hotels) (Scotland) Order 2003 (S.S.I. 2003/188)
 Borders and Dumfries and Galloway National Health Service Trusts (Dissolution) Order 2003 (S.S.I. 2003/189)
 Shetland Islands Council (Papa Stour and Fetlar) Harbour Revision Order 2003 (S.S.I. 2003/190)
 Act of Sederunt (Rules of the Court of Session Amendment) (Fees of Solicitors) 2003 (S.S.I. 2003/194)
 Food Protection (Emergency Prohibitions) (Amnesic Shellfish Poisoning) (West Coast) (No. 16) (Scotland) Order 2002 Revocation Order 2003 (S.S.I. 2003/195)
 Food Protection (Emergency Prohibitions) (Amnesic Shellfish Poisoning) (Orkney) (No. 3) (Scotland) Order 2002 Revocation Order 2003 (S.S.I. 2003/197)
 TSE (Scotland) Amendment Regulations 2003 (S.S.I. 2003/198)
 Ethical Standards in Public Life etc. (Scotland) Act 2000 (Modification of Enactments) Order 2003 (S.S.I. 2003/199)

201-300

 National Health Service (General Ophthalmic Services) (Scotland) Amendment Regulations 2003 (S.S.I. 2003/201)
 Sheep Scab (Shetland Islands) Order 2003 (S.S.I. 2003/202)
 Ethical Standards in Public Life etc. (Scotland) Act 2000 (Register of Interests) Amendment Regulations 2003 (S.S.I. 2003/203)
 Pollution Prevention and Control (Designation of Waste Incineration Directive) (Scotland) Order 2003 (S.S.I. 2003/204)
 Regulation of Care (Scotland) Act 2001 (Commencement No. 3 and Transitional Provisions) Order 2003 (S.S.I. 2003/205)
 Environment Act 1995 (Commencement No. 21) (Scotland) Order 2003 (S.S.I. 2003/206)
 Access to Justice Act 1999 (Commencement No. 9 and Transitional Provisions) (Scotland) Order 2003 (S.S.I. 2003/207)
 SFGS Farmland Premium Scheme 2003 (S.S.I. 2003/209)
 Proceeds of Crime Act 2002 (Commencement No. 6, Transitional Provisions and Savings) (Scotland) Order 2003 (S.S.I. 2003/210)
 Lerwick Harbour Revision (Constitution) Order 2003 (S.S.I. 2003/211)
 Road Traffic (Vehicle Emissions) (Fixed Penalty) (Scotland) Regulations 2003 (S.S.I. 2003/212)
 National Health Service (Constitution of Health Boards) (Scotland) Amendment Order 2003 (S.S.I. 2003/217)
 National Health Service (Optical Charges and Payments) (Scotland) Amendment (No. 2) Regulations 2003 (S.S.I. 2003/218)
 Public Appointments and Public Bodies etc. (Scotland) Act 2003 (Commencement No. 1) Order 2003 (S.S.I. 2003/219)
 Police (Scotland) Amendment (No. 2) Regulations 2003 (S.S.I. 2003/220)
 Pollution Prevention and Control (Scotland) Amendment (No. 2) Regulations 2003 (S.S.I. 2003/221)
 Act of Sederunt (Rules of the Court of Session Amendment No. 2) (Proceeds of Crime Act 2002) 2003 (S.S.I. 2003/222)
 Act of Sederunt (Rules of the Court of Session Amendment No. 3) (Applications under the Nationality, Immigration and Asylum Act 2002) 2003 (S.S.I. 2003/223)
 Plant Health (Great Britain) Amendment (Scotland) Order 2003 (S.S.I. 2003/224)
 Products of Animal Origin (Third Country Imports) (Scotland) Amendment (No. 2) Regulations 2003 (S.S.I. 2003/225)
 Adults with Incapacity (Management of Residents' Finances) (Scotland) Revocation Regulations 2003 (S.S.I. 2003/226)
 Adults with Incapacity (Scotland) Act 2000 (Commencement No. 3) Partial Revocation Order 2003 (S.S.I. 2003/227)
 Disease Control (Interim Measures) (Scotland) Amendment Order 2003 (S.S.I. 2003/228)
 Pet Travel Scheme (Scotland) Order 2003 (S.S.I. 2003/229)
 Kyle of Sutherland Salmon Fishery District (Baits and Lures) Regulations 2003 (S.S.I. 2003/230)
 Rehabilitation of Offenders Act 1974 (Exclusions and Exceptions) (Scotland) Order 2003 (S.S.I. 2003/231)
 The General Commissioners of Income Tax (Expenses) (Scotland) Regulations 2003 (S.S.I. 2003/223)
 Act of Sederunt (Fees in the National Archives of Scotland) 2003 (S.S.I. 2003/234)
 Landfill (Scotland) Regulations 2003 (S.S.I. 2003/235)
 Scottish Public Services Ombudsman Act 2002 (Consequential Modification of Instruments) Order 2003 (S.S.I. 2003/242)
 Community Care (Direct Payments) (Scotland) Regulations 2003 (S.S.I. 2003/243)
 Food Protection (Emergency Prohibitions) (Amnesic Shellfish Poisoning) (West Coast) (Scotland) Order 2003 (S.S.I. 2003/244)
 Food Protection (Emergency Prohibitions) (Amnesic Shellfish Poisoning) (West Coast) (No. 2) (Scotland) Order 2003 (S.S.I. 2003/245)
 Act of Sederunt (Fees of Shorthand Writers in the Sheriff Court) (Amendment) 2003 (S.S.I. 2003/246)
 Act of Sederunt (Rules of the Court of Session Amendment No. 4) (Fees of Shorthand Writers) 2003 (S.S.I. 2003/247)
 Agricultural Holdings (Scotland) Act 2003 (Commencement No. 1) Order 2003 (S.S.I. 2003/248)
 Criminal Legal Aid (Youth Courts) (Scotland) Regulations 2003 (S.S.I. 2003/249)
 Montrose Port Authority Harbour Revision (Constitution) Order 2003 (S.S.I. 2003/258)
 The Lanarkshire Primary Care National Health Service Trust (Establishment) Amendment Order 2003 (S.S.I. 2003/259)
 Food Protection (Emergency Prohibitions) (Amnesic Shellfish Poisoning) (Orkney) (Scotland) Order 2003 (S.S.I. 2003/260)
 Act of Sederunt (Summary Applications, Statutory Applications and Appeals etc. Rules) Amendment (Immigration and Asylum) 2003 (S.S.I. 2003/261)
 Tobacco Advertising and Promotion (Sponsorship Transitional Provisions) (Scotland) Amendment Regulations 2003 (S.S.I. 2003/265)
 Adults with Incapacity (Management of Residents' Finances) (No. 2) (Scotland) Regulations 2003 (S.S.I. 2003/266)
 The Adults with Incapacity (Scotland) Act 2000 (Commencement No. 4) Order 2003 (S.S.I. 2003/267)
 Litter (Fixed Penalty) (Scotland) Order 2003 (S.S.I. 2003/268)
 National Health Service Superannuation Scheme (Scotland) Amendment (No. 2) Regulations 2003 (S.S.I. 2003/270)
 Urban Waste Water Treatment (Scotland) Amendment Regulations 2003 (S.S.I. 2003/273)
 Sweeteners in Food Amendment (Scotland) Regulations 2003 (S.S.I. 2003/274)
 Feeding Stuffs (Miscellaneous Amendments) (Scotland) Regulations 2003 (S.S.I. 2003/277)
 Food Supplements (Scotland) Regulations 2003 (S.S.I. 2003/278)
 Ethical Standards in Public Life etc. (Scotland) Act 2000 (Devolved Public Bodies) (No. 2) Order 2003 (S.S.I. 2003/279)
 St Mary's Music School (Aided Places) (Scotland) Amendment Regulations 2003 (S.S.I. 2003/280)
 Education (Assisted Places) (Scotland) Amendment Regulations 2003 (S.S.I. 2003/281)
 Road User Charging (Classes of Motor Vehicles) (Scotland) Regulations 2003 (S.S.I. 2003/282)
 Agricultural Wages (Scotland) Act 1949 Amendment Regulations 2003 (S.S.I. 2003/283)
 Home Energy Efficiency Scheme Amendment (Scotland) Regulations 2003 (S.S.I. 2003/284)
 Education (Student Loans) Amendment (Scotland) Regulations 2003 (S.S.I. 2003/285)
 Accountability of Local Authorities (Publication of Information about Finance and Performance) (Scotland) Regulations 2003 (S.S.I. 2003/286)
 Criminal Justice (Scotland) Act 2003 (Saving and Transitional Provisions) Order 2003 (S.S.I. 2003/287)
 Criminal Justice (Scotland) Act 2003 (Commencement No. 1) Order 2003 (S.S.I. 2003/288)
 Contaminants in Food (Scotland) Regulations 2003 (S.S.I. 2003/289)
 Drugs Courts (Scotland) Order 2003 (S.S.I. 2003/290)
 Cocoa and Chocolate Products (Scotland) Regulations 2003 (S.S.I. 2003/291)
 Road User Charging (Consultation and Publication) (Scotland) Regulations 2003 (S.S.I. 2003/292)
 Fruit Juices and Fruit Nectars (Scotland) Regulations 2003 (S.S.I. 2003/293)
 Agricultural Holdings (Relevant Date and Relevant Period) (Scotland) Order 2003 (S.S.I. 2003/294)
 National Health Service (Charges for Drugs and Appliances) (Scotland) Amendment (No. 2) Regulations 2003 (S.S.I. 2003/295)
 National Health Service (Pharmaceutical Services) (Scotland) Amendment Regulations 2003 (S.S.I. 2003/296)
 Stevenson College (Change of Name) (Scotland) Order 2003 (S.S.I. 2003/297)
 National Health Service (General Medical Services Supplementary Lists) (Scotland) Amendment Regulations 2003 (S.S.I. 2003/298)
 Collagen and Gelatine (Intra-Community Trade) (Scotland) Regulations 2003 (S.S.I. 2003/299)
 Sea Fishing (Restriction on Days at Sea) (Scotland) Amendment (No. 2) Order 2003 (S.S.I. 2003/300)

301-400

 Cremation (Scotland) Amendment Regulations 2003 (S.S.I. 2003/301)
 Agricultural Subsidies (Appeals) (Scotland) Amendment Regulations 2003 (S.S.I. 2003/302)
 Rural Stewardship Scheme (Scotland) Amendment (No. 2) Regulations 2003 (S.S.I. 2003/303)
 Oil and Fibre Plant Seeds Amendment (Scotland) Regulations 2003 (S.S.I. 2003/304)
 Agricultural Holdings (Scotland) Act 2003 (Commencement No. 2) Order 2003 (S.S.I. 2003/305)
 National Health Service (Functions of the Common Services Agency) (Scotland) Amendment (No. 2) Order 2003 (S.S.I. 2003/306)
 National Health Service (General Medical Services) (Scotland) Amendment (No. 2) Regulations 2003 (S.S.I. 2003/310)
 Condensed Milk and Dried Milk (Scotland) Regulations 2003 (S.S.I. 2003/311)
 Feeding Stuffs (Scotland) Amendment (No. 2) Regulations 2003 (S.S.I. 2003/312)
 Improvement and Repairs Grant (Prescribed Valuation Band) (Scotland) Order 2003 (S.S.I. 2003/314)
 Food Protection (Emergency Prohibitions) (Amnesic Shellfish Poisoning) (West Coast) (Scotland) Partial Revocation Order 2003 (S.S.I. 2003/315)
 Mental Health (Care and Treatment) (Scotland) Act 2003 (Commencement No. 1) Order 2003 (S.S.I. 2003/316)
 Act of Sederunt (Summary Applications, Statutory Applications and Appeals etc. Rules) Amendment (Anti social Behaviour Orders) 2003 (S.S.I. 2003/319)
 Food Protection (Emergency Prohibitions) (Amnesic Shellfish Poisoning) (Orkney) (No. 2) (Scotland) Order 2003 (S.S.I. 2003/321)
 Argyll and Clyde National Health Service Trusts (Dissolution) Order 2003 (S.S.I. 2003/325)
 Collagen and Gelatine (Intra-Community Trade) (Scotland) Amendment Regulations 2003 (S.S.I. 2003/328)
 Budget (Scotland) Act 2003 Amendment Order 2003 (S.S.I. 2003/330)
 Water Industry (Scotland) Act 2002 (Consequential Provisions) Order 2003 (S.S.I. 2003/331)
 Products of Animal Origin (Third Country Imports) (Scotland) Amendment (No. 3) Regulations 2003 (S.S.I. 2003/333)
 Diseases of Animals (Approved Disinfectants) Amendment (Scotland) Order 2003 (S.S.I. 2003/334)
 Form of Repair Notice (Scotland) Regulations 2003 (S.S.I. 2003/335)
 Form of Improvement Order (Scotland) Regulations 2003 (S.S.I. 2003/336)
 Housing Grants (Form of Cessation or Partial Cessation of Conditions Notice) (Scotland) Regulations 2003 (S.S.I. 2003/337)
 Housing Grants (Form of Notice of Payment) (Scotland) Regulations 2003 (S.S.I. 2003/338)
 Environmental Impact Assessment (Water Management) (Scotland) Regulations 2003 (S.S.I. 2003/341)
 Landfill (Scotland) Amendment Regulations 2003 (S.S.I. 2003/343)
 National Health Service (Compensation for Premature Retirement) (Scotland) Regulations 2003 (S.S.I. 2003/344)
 Act of Sederunt (Summary Applications, Statutory Applications and Appeals etc. Rules) Amendment (Standards Commission for Scotland) 2003 (S.S.I. 2003/346)
 Public Appointments and Public Bodies etc. (Scotland) Act 2003 (Commencement No. 2) Order 2003 (S.S.I. 2003/348)
 Education (School Meals) (Scotland) Regulations 2003 (S.S.I. 2003/350)
 Movement of Animals (Restrictions) (Scotland) Order 2003 (S.S.I. 2003/353)
 Diseases of Poultry (Scotland) Order 2003 (S.S.I. 2003/354)
 Greenburn Light Railway (Scotland) Order 2003 (S.S.I. 2003/359)
 Food Protection (Emergency Prohibitions) (Amnesic Shellfish Poisoning) (West Coast) (No. 3) (Scotland) Order 2003 (S.S.I. 2003/365)
 Food Protection (Emergency Prohibitions) (Amnesic Shellfish Poisoning) (East Coast) (Scotland) Order 2003 (S.S.I. 2003/366)
 Food Protection (Emergency Prohibitions) (Amnesic Shellfish Poisoning) (East Coast) (No. 2) (Scotland) Order 2003 (S.S.I. 2003/369)
 Prohibition of Fishing for Scallops (Scotland) Order 2003 (S.S.I. 2003/371)
 Food Protection (Emergency Prohibitions) (Amnesic Shellfish Poisoning) (West Coast) (No. 4) (Scotland) Order 2003 (S.S.I. 2003/374)
 Food Protection (Emergency Prohibitions) (Radioactivity in Sheep) Partial Revocation (Scotland) Order 2003 (S.S.I. 2003/375)
 National Health Service (Travelling Expenses and Remission of Charges) (Scotland) Regulations 2003 (S.S.I. 2003/376)
 Sexual Offences (Amendment) Act 2000 (Commencement No. 4) (Scotland) Order 2003 (S.S.I. 2003/378)
 Food Protection (Emergency Prohibitions) (Amnesic Shellfish Poisoning) (East Coast) (No. 3) (Scotland) Order 2003 (S.S.I. 2003/380)
 Food Protection (Emergency Prohibitions) (Amnesic Shellfish Poisoning) (West Coast) (No. 5) (Scotland) Order 2003 (S.S.I. 2003/381)
 Food (Hot Chilli and Hot Chilli Products) (Emergency Control) (Scotland) Regulations 2003 (S.S.I. 2003/382)
 Public Appointments and Public Bodies etc. (Scotland) Act 2003 (Commencement No. 3) Order 2003 (S.S.I. 2003/384)
 Act of Sederunt (Rules of the Court of Session Amendment No.5) (Insolvency Proceedings) 2003 (S.S.I. 2003/385)
 Act of Adjournal (Criminal Appeals) 2003 (S.S.I. 2003/387)
 Act of Sederunt (Sheriff Court Company Insolvency Rules 1986) Amendment 2003 (S.S.I. 2003/388)
 Food Protection (Emergency Prohibitions) (Amnesic Shellfish Poisoning) (West Coast) (No. 6) (Scotland) Order 2003 (S.S.I. 2003/392)
 Food Protection (Emergency Prohibitions) (Amnesic Shellfish Poisoning) (East Coast) (No. 4) (Scotland) Order 2003 (S.S.I. 2003/393)
 Food Protection (Emergency Prohibitions) (Amnesic Shellfish Poisoning) (East Coast) (No. 5) (Scotland) Order 2003 (S.S.I. 2003/394)
 Food (Brazil Nuts) (Emergency Control) (Scotland) Regulations 2003 (S.S.I. 2003/396)
 Food Protection (Emergency Prohibitions) (Amnesic Shellfish Poisoning) (West Coast) (No. 7) (Scotland) Order 2003 (S.S.I. 2003/397)

401-500

 Nursing and Midwifery Student Allowances (Scotland) Amendment Regulations 2003 (S.S.I. 2003/401)
 Food Protection (Emergency Prohibitions) (Amnesic Shellfish Poisoning) (West Coast) (No. 8) (Scotland) Order 2003 (S.S.I. 2003/402)
 Gaming Act (Variation of Fees) (Scotland) Order 2003 (S.S.I. 2003/403)
 Inshore Fishing (Prohibition of Fishing and Fishing Methods) (Scotland) Amendment Order 2003 (S.S.I. 2003/404)
 Collagen and Gelatine (Intra-Community Trade) (Scotland) Amendment (No. 2) Regulations 2003 (S.S.I. 2003/405)
 Police Pensions (Scotland) Amendment Regulations 2003 (S.S.I. 2003/406)
 Food Protection (Emergency Prohibitions) (Amnesic Shellfish Poisoning) (West Coast) (No. 9) (Scotland) Order 2003 (S.S.I. 2003/409)
 Food Protection (Emergency Prohibitions) (Amnesic Shellfish Poisoning) (West Coast) (No. 10) (Scotland) Order 2003 (S.S.I. 2003/410)
 Animal By-Products (Scotland) Regulations 2003 (S.S.I. 2003/411)
 Food (Figs, Hazelnuts and Pistachios from Turkey) (Emergency Control) (Scotland) Amendment Regulations 2003 (S.S.I. 2003/413)
 Food (Pistachios from Iran) (Emergency Control) (Scotland) Regulations 2003 (S.S.I. 2003/414)
 Road Works (Inspection Fees) (Scotland) Regulations 2003 (S.S.I. 2003/415)
 Road Works (Recovery of Costs) (Scotland) Regulations 2003 (S.S.I. 2003/416)
 Road Works (Reinstatement) (Scotland) Amendment Regulations 2003 (S.S.I. 2003/417)
 Food (Peanuts from Egypt) (Emergency Control) (Scotland) Regulations 2003 (S.S.I. 2003/418)
 Food (Peanuts from China) (Emergency Control) (Scotland) Amendment Regulations 2003 (S.S.I. 2003/419)
 Housing Grants (Application Forms) (Scotland) Regulations 2003 (S.S.I. 2003/420)
 Advice and Assistance (Scotland) Amendment (No. 2) Regulations 2003 (S.S.I. 2003/421)
 National Health Service (General Dental Services) (Scotland) Amendment (No. 2) Regulations 2003 (S.S.I. 2003/422)
 Teachers' Superannuation (Scotland) Amendment Regulations 2003 (S.S.I. 2003/423)
 Children's Hearings (Provision of Information by Principal Reporter) (Prescribed Persons) (Scotland) Order 2003 (S.S.I. 2003/424)
 National Assistance (Assessment of Resources) Amendment (No. 3) (Scotland) Regulations 2003 (S.S.I. 2003/25)
 Classical Swine Fever (Scotland) Order 2003 (S.S.I. 2003/426)
 Land Reform (Scotland) Act (Commencement No. 1) Order 2003 (S.S.I. 2003/427)
 Air Quality Limit Values (Scotland) Regulations 2003 (S.S.I. 2003/428)
 Food Protection (Emergency Prohibitions) (Amnesic Shellfish Poisoning) (Orkney) (No. 3) (Scotland) Order 2003 (S.S.I. 2003/429)
 National Health Service (Optical Charges and Payments) (Scotland) Amendment (No. 3) Regulations 2003 (S.S.I. 2003/431)
 National Health Service (General Ophthalmic Services) (Scotland) Amendment (No. 2) Regulations 2003 (S.S.I. 2003/432)
 Scottish Water Prevention of Water Pollution (Loch Katrine, Loch Arklet, Glen Finglas) Byelaws Extension Order 2003 (S.S.I. 2003/433)
 Housing (Scotland) Act 2001 (Commencement No. 7, Transitional Provisions and Savings) Order 2003 (S.S.I. 2003/434)
 Stornoway Harbour Revision (Constitution) Order 2003 (S.S.I. 2003/435)
 Smoke Control Area (Exempt Fireplaces) (Scotland) Order 2003 (S.S.I. 2003/436)
 Food (Star Anise from Third Countries) (Emergency Control) (Scotland) Revocation Order 2003 (S.S.I. 2003/437)
 Criminal Justice (Scotland) Act 2003 (Transitional Provisions) Order 2003 (S.S.I. 2003/438)
 Criminal Justice (Scotland) Act 2003 (Commencement No. 2) Order 2003 (S.S.I. 2003/439)
 Victims' Rights (Prescribed Bodies) (Scotland) Order 2003 (S.S.I. 2003/440)
 Victim Statements (Prescribed Offences) (Scotland) Order 2003 (S.S.I. 2003/441)
 National Health Service (General Medical Services) (Scotland) Amendment (No. 3) Regulations 2003 (S.S.I. 2003/443)
 Pesticides (Maximum Residue Levels in Crops, Food and Feeding Stuffs) (Scotland) Amendment (No. 2) Regulations 2003 (S.S.I. 2003/445)
 Compulsory Purchase of Land (Scotland) Regulations 2003 (S.S.I. 2003/446)
 Fife National Health Service Trusts (Dissolution) Order 2003 (S.S.I. 2003/448)
 Lands Tribunal for Scotland (Relevant Certificate) (Fees) Rules 2003 (S.S.I. 2003/451)
 Lands Tribunal for Scotland Rules 2003 (S.S.I. 2003/452)
 Title Conditions (Scotland) Act 2003 (Conservation Bodies) Order 2003 (S.S.I. 2003/453)
 Title Conditions (Scotland) Act 2003 (Commencement No. 1) Order 2003 (S.S.I. 2003/454)
 Abolition of Feudal Tenure etc. (Scotland) Act 2000 (Commencement No. 1) Order 2003 (S.S.I. 2003/455)
 Abolition of Feudal Tenure etc. (Scotland) Act 2000 (Commencement No. 2) (Appointed Day) Order 2003 (S.S.I. 2003/456)
 National Health Service (Travelling Expenses and Remission of Charges) (Scotland) (No. 2) Regulations 2003 (S.S.I. 2003/460)
 Housing Grants (Assessment of Contributions) (Scotland) Regulations 2003 (S.S.I. 2003/461)
 Housing Grants (Minimum Percentage Grant) (Scotland) Regulations 2003 (S.S.I. 2003/462)
 Civic Government (Scotland) Act 1982 (Licensing of Houses in Multiple Occupation) Amendment Order 2003 (S.S.I. 2003/463)
 Collagen and Gelatine (Intra Community Trade) (Scotland) Revocation Regulations 2003 (S.S.I. 2003/466)
 Act of Adjournal (Criminal Procedure Rules Amendment No.2) (Miscellaneous) 2003 (S.S.I. 2003/468)
 Feeding Stuffs (Scotland) Amendment (No. 3) Regulations 2003 (S.S.I. 2003/474)
 Criminal Justice (Scotland) Act 2003 (Commencement No. 3 and Revocation) Order 2003 (S.S.I. 2003/475)
 Protection of Animals (Anaesthetics) (Scotland) Amendment Order 2003 (S.S.I. 2003/476)
 Freedom of Information (Scotland) Act 2002 (Commencement No. 2) Order 2003 (S.S.I. 2003/477)
 Civil Legal Aid (Scotland) Amendment (No. 2) Regulations 2003 (S.S.I. 2003/486)
 Further and Higher Education (Scotland) Act 1992 Amendment Order 2003 (S.S.I. 2003/487)
 Welfare of Farmed Animals (Scotland) Amendment Regulations 2003 (S.S.I. 2003/488)
 Scottish Water, Prevention of Water Pollution (Milngavie Waterworks) Byelaws Extension Order 2003 (S.S.I. 2003/489)
 Cromarty Firth Port Authority (Constitution) Revision Order 2003 (S.S.I. 2003/491)
 Condensed Milk and Dried Milk (Scotland) Amendment Regulations 2003 (S.S.I. 2003/492)
 Food (Hot Chilli and Hot Chilli Products) (Emergency Control) (Scotland) Amendment Regulations 2003 (S.S.I. 2003/493)
 Food Protection (Emergency Prohibitions) (Amnesic Shellfish Poisoning) (East Coast) (No. 2) (Scotland) Revocation Order 2003 (S.S.I. 2003/494)
 Food Protection (Emergency Prohibitions) (Amnesic Shellfish Poisoning) (East Coast) (No. 5) (Scotland) Revocation Order 2003 (S.S.I. 2003/495)
 Mental Health (Care and Treatment) (Scotland) Act 2003 (Consequential Modification) Order 2003 (S.S.I. 2003/498)
 Advice and Assistance (Assistance by Way of Representation) (Scotland) Amendment Regulations 2003 (S.S.I. 2003/500)

501-600

 Food Protection (Emergency Prohibitions) (Amnesic Shellfish Poisoning) (Orkney) (No. 4) (Scotland) Order 2003 (S.S.I. 2003/501)
 Horticultural Produce (Community Grading Rules) (Scotland) Regulations 2003 (S.S.I. 2003/502)
 Title Conditions (Scotland) Act 2003 (Consequential Provisions) Order 2003 (S.S.I. 2003/503)
 Road Traffic Act 1991 (Special Parking Area) (Scotland) Order 2003 (S.S.I. 2003/508)
 Road Works (Sharing of Costs of Works) (Scotland) Regulations 2003 (S.S.I. 2003/509)
 Scottish Legal Aid Board (Employment of Solicitors to Provide Criminal Legal Assistance) Amendment Regulations 2003 (S.S.I. 2003/511)
 Road Works (Reinstatement) (Scotland) Amendment (No. 2) Regulations 2003 (S.S.I. 2003/512)
 Inshore Fishing (Prohibition of Fishing and Fishing Methods) (Scotland) Amendment (No. 2) Order 2003 (S.S.I. 2003/514)
 Adults with Incapacity (Scotland) Act 2000 (Commencement No. 5) Order 2003 (S.S.I. 2003/516)
 National Health Service Superannuation Scheme (Scotland) Amendment (No. 3) Regulations 2003 (S.S.I. 2003/517)
 Nitrate Vulnerable Zones (Grants) (Scotland) Amendment Scheme 2003 (S.S.I. 2003/518)
 Victim Statements (Prescribed Offences) (Scotland) Amendment Order 2003 (S.S.I. 2003/519)
 Lands Tribunal for Scotland Amendment (Fees) Rules 2003 (S.S.I. 2003/521)
 Disposal of Records (Scotland) Amendment Regulations 2003 (S.S.I. 2003/522)
 Specified Sugar Products (Scotland) Regulations 2003 (S.S.I. 2003/527)
 Mink Keeping (Scotland) Order 2003 (S.S.I. 2003/528)
 Home Energy Efficiency Scheme Amendment (No. 2) (Scotland) Regulations 2003 (S.S.I. 2003/529)
 Public Finance and Accountability (Scotland) Act 2000 (Access to Documents and Information) (Relevant Persons) Order 2003 (S.S.I. 2003/530)
 Control of Pollution (Silage, Slurry and Agricultural Fuel Oil) (Scotland) Regulations 2003 (S.S.I. 2003/531)
 Housing (Scotland) Act 2001 (Transfer of Scottish Homes Property and Liabilities) Order 2003 (S.S.I. 2003/532)
 Environmental Protection (Duty of Care) Amendment (Scotland) Regulations 2003 (S.S.I. 2003/533)
 Scottish Milk Marketing Board (Dissolution) Order 2003 (S.S.I. 2003/534)
 Act of Sederunt (Fees of Messengers-at-Arms) 2003 (S.S.I. 2003/536)
 Act of Sederunt (Rules of the Court of Session Amendment No. 6) (Diligence on the Dependence) 2003 (S.S.I. 2003/537)
 Act of Sederunt (Fees of Sheriff Officers) 2003 (S.S.I. 2003/538)
 Air Quality Limit Values (Scotland) Amendment Regulations 2003 (S.S.I. 2003/547)
 Agricultural Holdings (Scotland) Act 2003 (Commencement No. 3, Transitional and Savings Provisions) Order 2003 (S.S.I. 2003/548)
 Act of Sederunt (Summary Applications, Statutory Applications and Appeals etc. Rules) Amendment (International Protection of Adults) 2003 (S.S.I. 2003/556)
 Food Protection (Emergency Prohibitions) (Amnesic Shellfish Poisoning) (Orkney) (No. 3) (Scotland) Revocation Order 2003 (S.S.I. 2003/557)
 Food (Brazil Nuts) (Emergency Control) (Scotland) Amendment Regulations 2003 (S.S.I. 2003/558)
 Prohibition of Keeping or Release of Live Fish (Specified Species) (Scotland) Order 2003 (S.S.I. 2003/560)
 Food Protection (Emergency Prohibitions) (Amnesic Shellfish Poisoning) (West Coast) (No. 11) (Scotland) Order 2003 (S.S.I. 2003/561)
 Water Environment and Water Services (Scotland) Act 2003 (Commencement No. 1) Order 2003 (S.S.I. 2003/562)
 Victim Statements (Prescribed Courts) (Scotland) Order 2003 (S.S.I. 2003/563)
 Pig Carcase (Grading) Amendment (Scotland) Regulations 2003 (S.S.I. 2003/565)
 Race Relations Act 1976 (Statutory Duties) (Scotland) Amendment Order 2003 (S.S.I. 2003/566)
 Local Government in Scotland Act 2003 (Ancillary Provision) Order 2003 (S.S.I. 2003/567)
 Collagen and Gelatine (Intra-Community Trade) (Scotland) (No. 2) Regulations 2003 (S.S.I. 2003/568)
 Honey (Scotland) Regulations 2003 (S.S.I. 2003/569)
 Regulation of Care (Applications and Provision of Advice) (Scotland) Amendment (No. 2) Order 2003 (S.S.I. 2003/570)
 Regulation of Care (Excepted Services) (Scotland) Amendment Regulations 2003 (S.S.I. 2003/571)
 Regulation of Care (Requirements as to Care Services) (Scotland) Amendment (No. 2) Regulations 2003 (S.S.I. 2003/572)
 Regulation of Care (Fees) (Scotland) Amendment Order 2003 (S.S.I. 2003/573)
 Registration of Establishments Keeping Laying Hens (Scotland) Regulations 2003 (S.S.I. 2003/576)
 National Assistance (Assessment of Resources) Amendment (No. 4) (Scotland) Regulations 2003 (S.S.I. 2003/577)
 Food Labelling Amendment (Scotland) Regulations 2003 (S.S.I. 2003/578)
 Plant Protection Products (Scotland) Regulations 2003 (S.S.I. 2003/579)
 Local Government Pension Reserve Fund (Scotland) Regulations 2003 (S.S.I. 2003/580)
 Pupils' Educational Records (Scotland) Regulations 2003 (S.S.I. 2003/581)
 Agricultural Holdings (Consequential Amendments) (Scotland) Order 2003 (S.S.I. 2003/583)
 African Swine Fever (Scotland) Order 2003 (S.S.I. 2003/586)
 Regulation of Care (Scotland) Act 2001 (Transitional Provisions and Revocation) Order 2003 (S.S.I. 2003/587)
 Transport (Scotland) Act 2001 (Commencement No. 4) Order 2003 (S.S.I. 2003/588)
 Food Protection (Emergency Prohibitions) (Amnesic Shellfish Poisoning) (East Coast) (Scotland) Revocation Order 2003 (S.S.I. 2003/589)
 Food Protection (Emergency Prohibitions) (Amnesic Shellfish Poisoning) (East Coast) (No. 3) (Scotland) Revocation Order 2003 (S.S.I. 2003/590)
 Food Protection (Emergency Prohibitions) (Amnesic Shellfish Poisoning) (Orkney) (No. 4) (Scotland) Revocation Order 2003 (S.S.I. 2003/591)
 Food Protection (Emergency Prohibitions) (Amnesic Shellfish Poisoning) (East Coast) (No. 4) (Scotland) Partial Revocation Order 2003 (S.S.I. 2003/592)
 The End-of-Life Vehicles (Storage and Treatment) (Scotland) Regulations 2003 (S.S.I. 2003/593)
 Proceeds of Crime Act 2002 Amendment (Scotland) Order 2003 (S.S.I. 2003/594)
 Regulation of Care (Scotland) Act 2001 (Commencement No. 4) Order 2003 (S.S.I. 2003/596)
 Lothian University Hospitals National Health Service Trust (Dissolution) Order 2003 (S.S.I. 2003/597)
 Food Protection (Emergency Prohibitions) (Amnesic Shellfish Poisoning) (West Coast) (No. 7) (Scotland) Revocation Order 2003 (S.S.I. 2003/598)
 Miscellaneous Food Additives Amendment (Scotland) (No. 2) Regulations 2003 (S.S.I. 2003/599)
 Pollution Prevention and Control (Designation of Solvent Emissions Directive) (Scotland) Order 2003 (S.S.I. 2003/600

601-623
 Act of Sederunt (Taking of Evidence in the European Community) 2003 (S.S.I. 2003/601)
 Public Appointments and Public Bodies etc. (Scotland) Act 2003 (Commencement No. 4) Order 2003 (S.S.I. 2003/602)
 Budget (Scotland) Act 2003 Amendment (No. 2) Order 2003 (S.S.I. 2003/603)
 Food Protection (Emergency Prohibitions) (Amnesic Shellfish Poisoning) (Orkney) (Scotland) Revocation Order 2003 (S.S.I. 2003/605)
 Food Protection (Emergency Prohibitions) (Amnesic Shellfish Poisoning) (West Coast) (No. 5) (Scotland) Partial Revocation Order 2003 (S.S.I. 2003/606)
 Local Government in Scotland Act 2003 (Principal Teachers) Order 2003 (S.S.I. 2003/607)
 Support and Assistance of Young People Leaving Care (Scotland) Regulations 2003 (S.S.I. 2003/608)
 Homelessness etc. (Scotland) Act 2003 (Commencement No. 1) Order 2003 (S.S.I. 2003/609)
 Water Environment and Water Services (Scotland) Act 2003 (Designation of Scotland River Basin District) Order 2003 (S.S.I. 2003/610)
 Producer Responsibility Obligations (Packaging Waste) Amendment (Scotland) Regulations 2003 (S.S.I. 2003/613)
 River Ewe Salmon Fishery District (Baits and Lures) Revocation Regulations 2003 (S.S.I. 2003/614)
 Wester Ross Salmon Fishery District Designation Order 2003 (S.S.I. 2003/615)
 Abolition of Feudal Tenure etc. (Scotland) Act 2000 (Commencement No. 3) Order 2003 (S.S.I. 2003/620)
 Title Conditions (Scotland) Act 2003 (Conservation Bodies) Amendment Order 2003 (S.S.I. 2003/621)
 Sea Fishing (Restriction on Days at Sea) (Scotland) Amendment (No. 3) Order 2003 (S.S.I. 2003/623)

External links
 Scottish Statutory Instrument List
 Scottish  Draft Statutory Instrument List

2003
Statutory Instruments
Scotland Statutory Instruments